Justice Lyon may refer to:

Richard F. Lyon (judge) (1819–1894), associate justice of the Supreme Court of Georgia
William P. Lyon (1822–1913), associate justice and chief justice of the Supreme Court of Wisconsin

See also
Justice Lyons (disambiguation)